Paulino Torres Santos Sr. (June 22, 1890 – August 29, 1945) was a military officer who became the Commanding General of the Philippine Army from May 6 to December 31, 1936. Upon his retirement, he served as a civilian administrator under President Manuel L. Quezon. He is the namesake of the city of General Santos, which was renamed from Buayan in 1954.

Early life
Paulino Torres Santos was born in Camiling, Tarlac to Remigio Santos and Rosa Torres. After his Spanish education from 1897 to 1900, he enrolled in an English school in 1901. In 1907, when he had finished the sixth grade, he was appointed as municipal teacher, a post which he held until the following year. In 1908, at age 18, he was an enlisted man in the Philippine Constabulary and he had just completed his first enlistment when he was named civil service clerk at the PC headquarters in 1912. That same year, he enrolled in the Constabulary Officers' School wherein, two years later, he graduated valedictorian. Santos was appointed as Third Lieutenant of the PC in 1914, and as such, he worked hard and continued studying to be more effective in his assignment as a field officer.

Personal life
General Santos was married to Elisa Angeles of Bulacan, with whom he had seven children, including Rosa Santos Munda.

Military service
As a soldier, Santos served in the Lanao campaign in 1916, where he sustained wounds from a Moro spear, and in the Bayang Cota campaign in 1917, where he was wounded anew, but this time by bullets. As government cannons were bombarding the Muslim bulwark of Lumamba, Lieutenant Santos led his platoon in penetrating the formerly secure redoubt, through an opening made in the barricade, and immediately erected a ladder to scale the first kota. Immediately, he and his men engaged its defenders in a bloody hand-to-hand combat, killing 30 of them, and thus preserving the lives of government soldiers. For this exceptional military feat, Governor General Frank Murphy bestowed on him the Medal of Valor, the highest Philippine military award for "gallantry in action", just before the inauguration of the Commonwealth government in 1935. He was named President Quezon's aide for the inaugural ceremony.

Medal of Valor citation
"By direction of the President, the MEDAL FOR VALOR is hereby awarded to:

For exceptional conduct and conspicuous courage displayed at Bayang Cotta, Lanao del Sur on 26 July 1917.

Then a Philippine Constabulary Second Lieutenant, Paulino Santos was tasked to participate in the Bayang Cotta campaign in which three companies of Philippine Scouts were also involved to neutralize bands of Moro outlaws. Among them was the group of Ampuan-Agos, the most famous of all Lanao outlaw chiefs.

The fully armed bands, numbering about 500, were entrenched in a well-constructed and fortified cotta surrounded with barbed wire and bamboo spikes. Lieutenant Santos led government troops in assaulting the outlaws' position. With the use of scaling ladders, they stormed the cotta and killed 30 outlaws.

In this gallant act, one PC soldier was killed while five others were wounded. Lieutenant Santos sustained a near-fatal gunshot wound at the back of the head."

Public service
He served as ex-officio Justice of the Peace at large for the Provinces of Lanao and Sulu, and then Deputy Provincial Treasurer of Lanao, before finally becoming Provincial Governor of Lanao. He was appointed Director of the Bureau of Prisons in 1930, serving thus until 1936, founding the Davao Penal Colony in 1932 and transferring the Bilibid Prisons from its old site to a new one in Muntinlupa, Rizal.

Return to military service
In 1936, he was recalled to military service through his appointment as brigadier general and assistant chief of staff of the Philippine Army by President Quezon. Before the year’s end, however, he was named Chief of Staff of the Philippine Army with the rank of major general.

In 1937, President Quezon gave him the difficult and dangerous task of minimizing, if not eliminating the problem of Moro piracy in the south through the destruction of the pirates’ kotas, particularly Kota Dilausan, in Lanao. His term as Army chief of staff ended in December 1938. In January 1939, he was named general manager of the National Land Settlement Administration. He served in this capacity until 1941, when World War II broke out. In 1917, Paulino Santos became the first provincial commander of Lanao and Sulu. As commandant and governor, improvements on agriculture, education and communication were achieved in the region. Serving as deputy governor up to 1924, he acted as the auxiliary justice of the peace in the municipal districts of both Lanao and Sulu at the same time.

Later, Santos was appointed as the assistant commander of Southern Luzon, and was given the rank of a lieutenant colonel. In October 1930, he was designated as assistant chief of the Philippine Constabulary where he served for more than 20 years. After his retirement, Pres. Manuel Quezon persuaded him to become the Director of Prisons in 1936. Santos then established the Davao Penal Colony, and sped up its transfer to the New Bilibid Prison in Muntinlupa. Although the jurisdiction Bureau of Prisons was transferred by law in 1937 to the Department of Justice, Santos remained its director, as requested by Quezon, while simultaneously performing his army duties. He was also the first head of "Estado Mayor ng Hukbong Pilipino" and became the administrator of the Land Settlement Administration.

NLSA Administrator
With orders from Pres. Quezon, he led the first group of 200 migrants from Luzon and the Visayas who transformed the primeval Lagao area in Koronadal Valley into a productive and progressive colony of six communities on Feb. 27, 1939. Being the man of action that he was, Santos usually stayed with the men in the field, constantly exhorting them to give their best to the arduous task with discipline and high purpose together with his personal aide Eliodoro M. Pantua.

Collaboration with the Japanese
During the Japanese occupation, the Japanese occupied the upper Koronadal and Allah valleys. GM Santos decided to cooperate with the Japanese to prevent further bloodshed. Santos and the Japanese Commander agreed to "not molest or abuse civilians in all districts of Koronadal valley but with the condition that the people will cooperate and never commit any wrong move otherwise they will feel the repressive force of Japanese displeasure". He accepted to serve as manager of the Koronadal and Allah valley projects under Japanese orders. In 1943, he became Commissioner for Mindanao and Sulu.

Commanding General of the Bureau of Constabulary under Japanese control
In August 1944, he was called by Pres. Jose P. Laurel to go to Manila. There, he was appointed as Commanding General of the Bureau of Constabulary. He was appointed to survey Northern Luzon since the Americans started bombing the Philippines. He went to Nueva Ecija accompanied by his aide, Sgt. Juan "Johnny" Ablan. He not only supplied the people with food, water, etc. but also aided the guerilla groups operating in the North. He was taken prisoner by Major General Kenshichi Masouka (1888–1964), The Japanese General In-Charge of keeping watch over Gen. Santos and his aide. He and his men forced Santos and Ablan to the North, first to Nueva Vizcaya, and then to Sitio Tamangan in the Ifugao mountains of Kiangan, Mountain Province, where the Japanese forces had retreated.

Death
While taken prisoner by the Japanese, General Santos fell ill, mostly due to effects of inclement weather and his desire to refrain from taking full meals because of food shortage. General Masouka refused to take the sick general to an American hospital, a few kilometers from Kiangan. Finally, on August 29, 1945, Santos died of pneumonia at the age of 55.

Legacy

Paulino Santos' record as an officer was one of distinctive achievements. As a soldier, Santos served in the Lanao campaign in 1916, where he sustained wounds from a Moro spear, and in the Bayang Cotta campaign in 1917, where he sustained a near fatal wound at the back of his head after he and his men performed a suicidal mission in which they had to place ladders beside the fortified cottas. It was in the latter campaign that he demonstrated extraordinary courage and leadership. Under his term, he established six settlements in South Cotabato namely  Koronadal, Banga, Tupi, Tampakan, Polomolok, and Buayan, thus, increasing Christian population in the region.

As a tribute to his legacy in the area, the municipality of Buayan (formerly Dadiangas) was renamed General Santos in June 1954, which, by virtue of Republic Act No. 5412 signed on July 8, 1968, was declared a city. A grave and monument of Gen. Paulino Santos was unveiled in front of its City Hall on September 5, 1981 in General Santos, South Cotabato.

The Koronadal section of the South Cotabato-Sarangani Road was also named as "General Santos Drive", while the radial road leading to the New Bilibid Prison in Muntinlupa was also named as "Gen. Paulino Santos Avenue" as an honor for his service as a former Director of the Bureau of Prisons. He was instrumental in the transfer of the prison to the present area. Taguig's main avenue, fronting Camp Bagong Diwa of the Philippine National Police, also a former Philippine Constabulary camp, the  Hall of Justice, and the Department of Science and Technology was also similarly named as "General Santos Avenue".

One of the urban Barangays of Koronadal is named after him using the initials of his rank and name, called as Barangay GPS, City of Koronadal (GPS - General Paulino Santos)

As Chief of Staff of the Philippine Army, Major General Santos is a pioneer in the Self Reliance Defence concept as early as the 1930s. Maj. Gen. Santos intended to have all supplies for the new Commonwealth army made if possible in the Philippines.

References

. (accessed on September 17, 2007).
. (accessed on September 17, 2007).
. (accessed on September 17, 2007).
. (accessed on September 20, 2016).
 National Historical Institute. Historical Markers: Regions V - XII. Manila: National Historical Institute, 1993.
 Gwekoh, Sol H. Hall of Fame. Manila Times.

|-

|-

Philippine Army generals
Chairmen of the Joint Chiefs (Philippines)
Philippine Military Academy alumni
Filipino city founders
Military history of the Philippines
Filipino military personnel of World War II
Recipients of the Philippine Medal of Valor
1890 births
1945 deaths
Prisoners who died in Japanese detention
People from Tarlac
Armed Forces of the Philippines Medal of Valor
Quezon administration personnel
Osmeña administration personnel